Helen Hunt Falls is a waterfall located on Cheyenne Creek in the North Cheyenne Cañon Park of Colorado Springs, Colorado.

The falls are located on North Cheyenne Creek immediately off North Cheyenne Canyon Road in the North Cheyenne Canyon Park.  There is parking for about 30 vehicles at the falls and it becomes crowded early during summer months when visits to the canyon are popular among locals and tourists.  The Columbine Trail, which starts at the entrance of the Park by the Starsmore Visitor and Nature Center, terminates at Helen Hunt Falls.  Visitors can hike a short distance of about 2/3 of a mile up a moderately steep trail above Helen Hunt Falls to reach Silver Cascade Falls.

The falls are named in honor of Helen Maria Hunt Jackson (October 15, 1830 – August 12, 1885), a United States poet and writer who became an activist on behalf of improved treatment of Native Americans by the U.S. government.  She died in San Francisco, California in 1885 and was later buried in Colorado Springs.

Images

References

See also
Waterfalls of Colorado

Waterfalls of Colorado
Landforms of El Paso County, Colorado
Parks in Colorado Springs, Colorado
Cascade waterfalls